Pirate King is a 2011 mystery novel by American author Laurie R. King. Eleventh in the Mary Russell series, the story features married detectives Mary Russell and Sherlock Holmes.

Sent to Lisbon and Morocco, where British studio Fflytte Films are creating a silent film version of The Pirates of Penzance, undercover Mary Russell investigates a series of crimes targeting the production and confronts a high-stakes situation when actual pirates orchestrate a hostage situation.

External links
 Laurie R. King official website

2011 American novels
Mary Russell (book series)
Sherlock Holmes pastiches
Bantam Books books
Allison and Busby books